Hessebius, is a genus of centipedes belonging to the family Lithobiidae. The genus comprised 17 species.

Species
Hessebius armatus Verhoeff, 1943
Hessebius barbipes Porat, (1893)
Hessebius golovatchi Farzalieva, 2017
Hessebius jangtseanus (Verhoeff, 1942)
Hessebius kosswigi Verhoeff, 1941
Hessebius longispinipes Ma, Pei & Zhu, 2009
Hessebius luquensis Qiao, Qin, Ma, Su, Zhang, 1999
Hessebius luculentus Ma, Lu, Liu, Hou, Pei, 2018
Hessebius major Folkmanova & Dobroruka, 1960
Hessebius megapus Muralevitch, (1907)
Hessebius multicalcaratus Folkmanová, 1958
Hessebius multiforaminis Pei, Ma, Zapparoli & Zhu, 2010
Hessebius perelae Zalesskaja, 1978
Hessebius pervagatus Zalesskaja, 1978
Hessebius plumatus Zalesskaja, 1978
Hessebius ruoergaiensis Qiao, Qin, Ma, Su, Zhang, 
Hessebius zalesskajae Farzalieva, 2017

References

External links
Reproduction, egg morphology and development observed in two Australian penicillate millipedes, Lophoturus queenslandicus (Lophoproctidae) and Phryssonotus novaehollandiae (Synxenidae) (Diplopoda)

Polyxenida